Danaçı (also, Danachi, Danachy, and Tanachi) is a village and municipality in the Zaqatala Rayon of Azerbaijan. It is situated near the Azerbaijan–Georgia border and has a population of 6,796.

Gallery

References 

Populated places in Zaqatala District